Miriam "Miri" Regev (born Miriam Siboni on 26 May 1965) is an Israeli politician and a former brigadier-general in the Israel Defense Forces, in which she served as IDF Spokeswoman. She currently serves as Ministry of Transport, National Infrastructure and Road Safety, having previously served as Minister of Culture and Sport. On 14 June 2017, she was appointed to be Acting Prime Minister of Israel whenever Prime Minister Benjamin Netanyahu needed to be abroad.

Early life
Regev was born in Kiryat Gat in 1965 to Sephardi Jewish immigrants. She went to Rogozin High School in Kiryat Gat. Her father, Felix, was from Morocco and her mother, Mercedes, was from Spain. In 1983, she joined the Gadna, where she became a platoon commander, serving in the position until 1986. She earned a bachelor's degree in Informal Education and an MBA from Ono Academic College.

Public relations career
She began serving as the IDF Spokesperson's representative in the Israeli Southern Command. Regev was promoted to a colonel rank for the position of Deputy IDF Spokesperson in 2002. In 2003, she was appointed coordinator of the national public relations efforts at the Israeli Prime Minister's Office in preparation for the Iraq War. After a short stint (2004–2005) as the Chief Press and Media Censor, she was promoted to the rank of brigadier general and to the position of IDF Spokesperson in 2005. She served in this position during Israel's disengagement from Gaza in 2005 and the 2006 Lebanon War. In 2007, she was discharged and was succeeded by Avi Benayahu.

Political career
In November 2008, Regev joined the Likud party, saying that she had been a supporter of the party's platform for many years. She won twenty-seventh place on the party's list for the 2009 elections, just high enough to enter the Knesset as Likud won 27 seats. At the 2015 elections Regev was re-elected, after being placed fifth on Likud's national list. She was subsequently appointed by Prime Minister Benjamin Netanyahu as Minister of Culture and Sport in the new government.

Revital Madar, a Tunisian-Israeli writer for Haaretz, stated that Regev had faced discrimination due to her Moroccan origins, and her forthright behaviour is perceived as being stereotypically Mizrahi.

Minister of Culture

In September 2015, four months in office, Regev announced a list of criteria that will cause the withdrawal of state funding the following year. The list included the deformation of state symbols and a call for boycotting Israel.

In July 2016, Regev announced that she would not participate in the 2016 Summer Olympics opening ceremonies, because they take place on Shabbat.

In her position as Minister of Culture, Regev frequently equates artistic Freedom of Expression with the power of the government to withdraw its funding, using the term "Freedom of Funding". Regev also argued that state-funded artists or organisations must show "loyalty" to the Israeli state. She has called this a "Loyalty in Culture" initiative, and has proposed legislation making "support for a cultural institution dependent on its loyalty to the state of Israel". She has said the group Breaking the Silence "hurts Israel's image" and accused a gallery that had hosted a talk by the group of "holding political activities".

At the closing ceremony of the 2017 Maccabiah Games on 18 July 2017, Regev passed the Maccabiah torch to a number of Maccabiah athletes.

In October 2018, she attended the Grand Slam Judo tournament in Abu Dhabi, United Arab Emirates. During that tournament, Regev was overwhelmed as the Hatikva was played in a Muslim Arab capital.

Ministry of Transport, National Infrastructure and Road Safety 
In May 2020, Regev was offered the portfolio of Ministry of Transport, National Infrastructure and Road Safety for the first half of the 35th government of Israel and the portfolio of foreign minister during the second half of the incoming government's term. She was sworn in to this position on 17 May 2020. She was replaced by Merav Michaeli following the formation of the 36th government on 14 June 2021.

On 29 December 2022, Regev was appointed the position for a second time by Benjamin Netanyahu during the formation of the thirty-seventh government of Israel.

Likud leadership bid
On August 14, 2021, Regev announced that she will run to succeed Netanyahu as leader of Likud. Stressing her Sephardi background, she stated "“The time has come to have a Sephardi prime minister, I think the Likud rank and file must vote this time for someone who represents their class, their ethnicity and their agenda." She also stated that she would not run against Netanyahu. She also made it clear that if she does not become leader of Likud, she may form a new party.

Views

Illegal immigration
In May 2012, at a demonstration against illegal immigrants in Tel Aviv, Regev said that "Sudanese infiltrators are a cancer in the nation's body". She later said that the quote was misrepresented, and, while justifying the comparison, apologized for seeming to compare human beings to cancer.

LGBT rights
Regev met with LGBT community members of her party, and said (in parallel to social activism), that "not only the left can support and embrace the gay community".

Personal life
She is married to Dror Regev, an engineer at Israel Aerospace Industries and has three children. Her husband is from a left-wing background
and holds some views opposing her own.

References

External links

1965 births
Living people
20th-century Israeli military personnel
21st-century Israeli military personnel
21st-century Israeli women politicians
Brigadier generals
Censors
Ministers of Culture of Israel
Female army generals
Female generals of Israel
Israel Defense Forces spokespersons
Israeli people of Moroccan-Jewish descent
Israeli people of Spanish-Jewish descent
Jewish Israeli politicians
Likud politicians
Members of the 18th Knesset (2009–2013)
Members of the 19th Knesset (2013–2015)
Members of the 20th Knesset (2015–2019)
Members of the 21st Knesset (2019)
Members of the 22nd Knesset (2019–2020)
Members of the 23rd Knesset (2020–2021)
Members of the 24th Knesset (2021–2022)
Members of the 25th Knesset (2022–)
Ministers of Sport of Israel
Ministers of Transport of Israel
Ono Academic College alumni
People from Kiryat Gat
Israeli Sephardi Jews
Women government ministers of Israel
Women in 20th-century warfare
Women in 21st-century warfare
Women members of the Knesset